Bębło  is a village in the administrative district of Gmina Wielka Wieś, within Kraków County, Lesser Poland Voivodeship, in southern Poland.

The village has a population of 1,015.

References

Villages in Kraków County